Dan Kearns (November 23, 1956 – February 28, 2022) was a Canadian football defensive lineman who played ten seasons in the Canadian Football League with the Edmonton Eskimos and Winnipeg Blue Bombers. He was drafted by the Edmonton Eskimos in the second round of the 1980 CFL Draft. He played CIS football at Simon Fraser University and attended Wexford High school in Scarborough, Ontario. Dan's twin brother Steve also played in the CFL. Kearns died of pancreatic cancer in 2022.

Early years
Kearns was born in São Luís, Maranhão, Brazil and played soccer as a youth. His family moved back to Canada so Dan and his brother Steve could attend Wexford High school. They first played Canadian football in Grade 11.

College career
Kearns played CIS football for the Simon Fraser Clan.

Professional career

Edmonton Eskimos
Kearns was selected by the Edmonton Eskimos with the 18th pick in the 1980 CFL Draft. He played for the Eskimos from 1980 to 1988, winning the Grey Cup four times.

Winnipeg Blue Bombers
Kearns played in four games for the Winnipeg Blue Bombers in 1989.

References

External links
Just Sports Stats

1956 births
2022 deaths
Players of Canadian football from Ontario
Canadian football defensive linemen
Simon Fraser Clan football players
Edmonton Elks players
Winnipeg Blue Bombers players
Canadian expatriates in Brazil
People from São Luís, Maranhão
Sportspeople from Scarborough, Toronto
Canadian football people from Toronto